Madavana Bhaskarannair Padmakumar is an Indian actor, television personality and filmmaker from Kerala.

Career
As an actor, he performed in a number of movies starting with Ashwaroodan (2006)  and more than 15 television serials in Malayalam. His directorial debut was the 2014 film My Life Partner, which investigated the close relationship between two men and caused some controversy, followed by 2015's Roopantharam, 2017's Telescope,

The release date of My Life Partner was delayed by a month because of its content, Kerala lacking "a socio-cultural space for LGBTs"; theater owners kept saying there were no screens available; in the end it was shown only in four small theaters and received a poor showing. To Padmakumar's surprise, it finished second best in the 45th Kerala State Film Awards, and also won for Best Lead Actor. Best Sound Mix, Best Background Score

Filmography

Director, producer, actor, writer and editor

Television

References

Living people
Male actors from Kerala
Indian male film actors
Malayalam film directors
Indian male television actors
Male actors in Malayalam cinema
Malayalam film editors
Malayalam screenwriters
21st-century Indian male actors
People from Thiruvalla
Screenwriters from Kerala
Film editors from Kerala
Year of birth missing (living people)